A total lunar eclipse will take place on August 7, 2036. The southern tip of the moon will pass through the center of the Earth's shadow. This is the last central lunar eclipse of Saros cycle 129.

Eclipse season
This is the second eclipse this season.

First eclipse this season: Partial solar eclipse of July 23, 2036

Third eclipse this season: Partial solar eclipse of August 21, 2036

Visibility
It will be completely visible over South America, seen as rising over North America, and setting over Africa and Europe.

Related lunar eclipses

Lunar year series

Saros series

It last occurred on July 27, 2018 and will next occur on August 18, 2054.

This is the 39th member of Lunar Saros 129. The previous event was the July 2018 lunar eclipse. The next event is the August 2054 lunar eclipse. Lunar Saros 129 contains 11 total lunar eclipses between 1910 and 2090. Solar Saros 136 interleaves with this lunar saros with an event occurring every 9 years 5 days alternating between each saros series.

Half-Saros cycle
A lunar eclipse will be preceded and followed by solar eclipses by 9 years and 5.5 days (a half saros). This lunar eclipse is related to two total solar eclipses of Solar Saros 136.

See also
List of lunar eclipses and List of 21st-century lunar eclipses

Notes

External links

2036-08
2036-08
2036-08
2036 in science